LendingCrowd is an online peer-to-peer lending company, based in Edinburgh, Scotland. As the first Scottish based crowdlending firm, LendingCrowd has created a platform that enables investors to support small and medium-sized businesses by lending personal capital through small loans whilst earning a monthly interest payment.

History

Launched in 2014, LendingCrowd is the trading name of Edinburgh Alternative Finance Ltd. and was founded by CEO Stuart Lunn. Since September 2014, the LendingCrowd platform has delivered more than £45 million in loans for over 500 SMEs across Britain  In October 2018, LendingCrowd announced the appointment of former Standard Life CEO Sir Sandy Crombie as its chairman.

Innovative Finance ISA
In February 2017 LendingCrowd became one of the first peer-to-peer business lending platforms to provide the Innovative Finance ISA. Only fully FCA authorised platforms are eligible to offer this product giving investors the opportunity to invest in peer-to-peer lending without having to pay tax on the interest earned.

Risk and Regulation

Financial Conduct Authority

LendingCrowd is authorised and regulated by the Financial Conduct Authority (FCA). In November 2016 LendingCrowd became one of the first peer-to-peer lenders to move from interim permissions to fully authorised.

See also
 Peer-to-peer lending
 Comparison of crowdfunding services

References

External links
Official site

Companies based in Edinburgh
Peer-to-peer lending companies